Crisp may refer to:

Foods
 Potato crisp, a thin slice of a potato deep fried or baked until crispy, known in American English as a potato chip
 Crisp (snack type)
 Crisp (dessert), a type of American dessert, usually including fruit
 Crisp (chocolate bar), a Nestlé brand of wafer candy sold in the United States
 Simit, in Ottoman cuisine, a circular bread

Places

United States
 Crisp, North Carolina, an unincorporated community
 Crisp, Texas, a ghost town
 Crisp, West Virginia, an unincorporated community
 Crisp County, Georgia

Antarctica
 Crisp Glacier, Victoria Land

People
 Crisp (surname), a list of people
 Crisp Gascoyne (1700–1761), English businessman and Lord Mayor of London
 Crisp Molineux (1730-1792), English Member of Parliament
 Michael Crisp (1950-), Australian botanist whose standard author abbreviation is Crisp

Other uses
 Crisp (horse), famous for the 1973 Grand National
 Crisp baronets, a title in the Baronetage of the United Kingdom

See also
 CRISP (disambiguation)
 Crisp Building, Sarasota, Florida, on the National Register of Historic Places
 Crisper (disambiguation)
 Crips